Baul Shah Abdul Karim (15 February 1916 — 12 September 2009) was a Bangladeshi Baul musician. He was awarded the Ekushey Padak in 2001 by the Government of Bangladesh. Some of his notable songs include "Agey Ki Shundor Din Kataitam", "Keno Piriti Baraila Re Bondhu", "Murshid Dhono He Kemone Chinibo Tomare", "Nao Banailo Banailo Re Kon Mestori", "Ashi Bole Gelo Bondhu" and "Mon Mojale Ore Bawla Gaan", Bonde Maya lagaise". He is widely regarded as one of the greatest Baul musicians. He referred to his compositions as Baul Gaan. Unlike bauls who are not married and have children, Shah Abdul Karim was married and had a son.

Early life 
Karim was born on 15 February 1911 in Derai in Sunamganj, Sylhet. He first learnt music from Baul Shah Ibrahim Mastan Baksh. In 1957, Karim had started living in Ujan Dhol, a village near his home, with his wife, Sarala Bibi.

Personal life 
Karim had a son named Shah Nur Jalal.

Karim died in Sylhet on 12 September 2009 due to respiratory problems.

Works 
Karim wrote and composed over 1600 songs. The Bangla Academy has translated ten of his songs into the English language.

Karim's songs are organized in six books:
 Aftab Sangeet (1948)
 Gano Sangeet (1957)
 Kalnir Dheu (1981)
 Dholmela (1990)
 Bhatir Chithi (1998) 
 Kalnir Kooley (2001)

Notable songs

References 

1916 births
2009 deaths
People from Derai Upazila
20th-century Bangladeshi male singers
20th-century Bangladeshi singers
Bangladeshi lyricists
Bangladeshi music directors
Recipients of the Ekushey Padak
Meril-Prothom Alo Lifetime Achievement Award winners